Goa is a town, or eup in Gumi, North Gyeongsang Province, South Korea. The township Goa-myeon was upgraded to the town Goa-eup in 1997. Goa Town Office is located in Gwansim-ri, which is crowded with people.

Communities
Goa-eup is divided into 18 villages (ri).

References

External links
Official website 

Gumi, North Gyeongsang
Towns and townships in North Gyeongsang Province